Rajapeta is a historic location, popularly known as Samsthan Rajapeta. This town has one of the popular forts of Indian state of Telangana located in Yadadri Bhuvanagiri district. Rajapeta, also known as the 'Southern Gateway' of Telangana, is unique in the state. The state is one of the most famous princely states. It is located at a distance of about 20 km from Yadagiri Gutta, a famous shrine in the Yadadri-Bhuvanagiri district. Here we can still see the forts of the Kakatiya period. Although the historical monuments of Rajapeta are in ruins, we can still see many things as living testimonies. Rajapeta Sansthan is one of the 14 princely states of Hyderabad during the Nizam's rule. The area has a history of 250 years. Many historic buildings, buildings, glass mounds, gardens, soldiers' parades and wide roads can still be seen here.

References

Villages in Yadadri Bhuvanagiri district
Mandal headquarters in Yadadri Bhuvanagiri district